Cockermouth railway station was situated on the Cockermouth, Keswick and Penrith Railway and served the town of Cockermouth, Cumbria, England.

The station was the second to be built in the town. The original Cockermouth & Workington Railway station closed to passengers when the CK&PR station opened on an altered alignment, though it remained in use as a goods station until 1964.

The latter station was immortalised in 1964 in the song "Slow Train" by Flanders and Swann. All traces of the station are now gone as the site is now occupied by The Cockermouth Mountain Rescue Base and the Cumbria Fire and Rescue Service. Running down the left hand side of The Fire Service building is the old track bed, now a public walkway; there are original bridges and features surviving to this day.

References

Further reading

External links 
 Station name: COCKERMOUTH

Beeching closures in England
Disused railway stations in Cumbria
Former Cockermouth, Keswick and Penrith Railway stations
Railway stations in Great Britain closed in 1966
Railway stations in Great Britain opened in 1865